Baltoscandian Confederation or Baltoscandia is a geopolitical concept of a Baltic–Scandinavian (Nordic) union comprising Denmark, Estonia, Finland, Iceland, Latvia, Lithuania, Norway, and Sweden. The idea was proposed by a Swedish Professor Sten de Geer (1886–1933) in the journal Geografiska Annaler in 1928 and further developed by Professor Kazys Pakštas (1893–1960), a Lithuanian scientist in the field of geography and geopolitics.

Development of the concept

Pakštas states in his book The Baltoscandian Confederation that the term Baltoscandia was first used by Sten de Geer in an article in "Geografiska Annaler" in 1928. Kazys Pakštas proposed that one of the ways for the small nations to withstand the influence coming from the large ones is to unite and to cooperate more closely among each other. As he mentions, unification is possible only among nations that are similar by their size, geographical environment, religion, also they have to respect and to tolerate each other.

As the foreign policy of Lithuania has shifted towards Northern Europe even more after Dalia Grybauskaitė came into post of the President of Lithuania, voices questioning the return of the Baltoscandian Confederation idea are on the rise in this country.

Advocacy
For almost 20 years, the Academy of Baltoscandia (Baltoskandijos akademija) functioned in Panevėžys, Lithuania. It was founded on 17 November 1991 as the institute of science researches which regularly organizes arrangements dealing with Baltic and Scandinavian cultural, historical and political contacts. Its main aims were to "develop versatile links of the lands and nations in the region of Baltoscandia and to integrate the culture of Lithuania into the cultural space of Baltoscandia". The academy was liquidated at the end of 2009 because of funding-related problems. The funding was provided by the Panevėžys city municipality, but the functions of the academy did not meet the criteria of the functions of the mentioned municipality.

Other terms
The Nordic-Baltic Eight or NB8, where 8 stands for the number of countries (Denmark, Estonia, Finland, Iceland, Latvia, Lithuania, Norway, and Sweden).

See also 

 Baltic region
 Fennoscandia
 Nordic countries
 Nordic Estonia
 Nordic Investment Bank

References

Regions of Europe
Geography of Scandinavia
Baltic states
Geography of Northern Europe